is a unit in the Japanese Maritime Self-Defence Force. It is a part of the Fleet Air Force and is based at Tokushima Air Base in Tokushima prefecture. It operates TC-90 aircraft.

History
Five TC-90 aircraft of the squadron will be leased to the Philippines for conducting naval patrols. The first two departed Japan on March 23, 2017. The squadron has also been conducting training for two Filipino naval pilots. The aircraft are assigned to Naval Aviation Squadron MF-30 of the Naval Air Group of the Philippine Navy.

References
 

Aviation in Japan
Units and formations of the Japan Maritime Self-Defense Force
Military units and formations established in 1973